Trilocha myodes is a moth in the family Bombycidae first described by West in 1932. It is found in the Philippines.

The wingspan is 23–29 mm. Adults are variable, ranging in colour from yellowish brown to brown and dark grey brown.

References

Moths described in 1932
Bombycidae